The following is a list of honorary doctorates awarded to Recep Tayyip Erdoğan, President of Turkey:
 St. John's University, 26 January 2004.
 Crimean State University, 3 April 2004.
 State University of Library Studies and Information Technologies, 18 May 2006.
 Girne American University, 20 July 2006.
 University of Sarajevo, 29 March 2008.
 Fatih University, 15 October 2008.
 Maltepe University, 4 July 2009.
 Istanbul University, 4 July 2009.
 University of Aleppo, 22 August 2009. (Revoked on 15 July 2013)
 Islamic University of Gaza, 16 April 2010.
 European University of Madrid, 18 May 2010.
 Black Sea Technical University, 12 June 2010.
 Piri Reis University, 2 October 2010.
 Harran University, 31 October 2010.
 University of Pristina, 4 November 2010.
 Taras Shevchenko University, 25 January 2011.
 Moscow State University, 16 March 2011.
 Umm al-Qura University, 21 March 2011.
 Istanbul Aydın University, 2 July 2011.
 Shanghai International Studies University, 11 April 2012.
 Quaid-i-Azam University, 22 May 2012.
 Atatürk University, 29 June 2012.
 Al-Quds University, 21 September 2012.
 Yıldız Technical University, 5 October 2012.
 Recep Tayyip Erdoğan University, 12 November 2012.
 Gaziantep University, 19 January 2013.
 Marmara University, 26 January 2013.
 Mohammed V University, 4 July 2013.
 University of Algiers, 5 July 2013.
 Pamukkale University, 28 September 2013.
 International Islamic University Malaysia, 10 January 2014.
 Turkmen Institute of International Relations, 7 November 2014.
 Addis Ababa University, 22 January 2015.
 İnönü University, 17 February 2015.
 Ahmet Yesevi University, 17 April 2015.
 Yıldırım Beyazıt University, 28 May 2015.
 Waseda University, 8 October 2015.
 Qatar University, 2 December 2015.
 Universidad San Ignacio de Loyola, 4 February 2016.
 Makerere University Kampala, 1 June 2016.
Jamia Millia Islamia, 1 May 2017.
International University of Sarajevo, May 20, 2018.
 Mukogawa Women's University, 27 June 2019.

References 

Honorary doctorates